Tulisa, the Wood-Cutter's Daughter is an Indian legend from the Somadeva Bhaṭṭa, related to Cupid and Psyche.

The tale belongs to the international cycle of the Animal as Bridegroom or Search for the Lost Husband: Tulisa, a woodcutter's daughter, agrees to marry the owner of a mysterious voice, and her father consents to their marriage and eventually becomes rich. Tulisa discovers the identity of her husband – a prince of serpents named Basnak Dau - and loses him, but eventually finds him. She helps Basnak Dau regain his former throne and they live together happily at last.

Source
French folklorist Emmanuel Cosquin claimed that the tale was first collected in 1833, from a washerwoman in Benares (Varanasi). An English language version of the tale, published in 1842, in The Asiatic Journal, claimed that the tale was "a great favourite amongst the people of Hindustan".

Synopsis

Tulisa, the beautiful daughter of a poor woodcutter (Nur Singh, or Nursingh), approaches a fountain, when she hears a voice, with a most strange proposition: "Will you marry me?". Not knowing whose voice it is, she pays no heed. The episode repeats a few times, and she tells her father of the curious happening.

Her would-be suitor is the Prince (or King) of Snakes, Basnak Dau, and promises riches to Tulisa's father, in exchange for his daughter hand in marriage. She relents to the proposal and moves into a splendid palace. Tulisa marries the mysterious owner of the voice, under the condition that she may never see her husband when he comes to the bridal bed, at night, and that she must not receive any visitor.

At a certain point, she helps a squirrel, who tells her it will return the favor in the future. One day, an old lady (a creature named Sarkasukis, in disguise) was helped by Tulisa into the palace. In conversation with the mistress of the house, the old lady persuades Tulisa into asking the name of her husband. The fateful day arrives: when Tulisa asks him the question, he answers his name is "Basnak Dau", and suddenly the palace and the prince vanish, and leave her there, alone.

Tulisa returns to her parents, once again in poverty. One day, she receives the visit of the grateful squirrel, and learns of the mystery of her husband: he is the Prince of Snakes, dethroned by his own mother. If she succeeds in taking the eyes from the snake that coils around the Queen's neck, by a specific bird (the Huma bird), the Queen will be defeated and the true King restored.

Tulisa and the squirrel arrive at the palace of the Queen of the Serpents in order to fulfill the tasks assigned to her, thanks to the squirrel's help. First, she receives a crystal casket and must fill it with the perfume of a thousand flowers, but she is guided to a walled garden. The second task is to change a bag full of seed into precious stones.

The last quest is to steal the egg of the Huma bird, across a moat filled with poisonous snakes. Tulisa, with the help of bees and squirrels, manages to accomplish the task.

Translations

The tale was published in the West in German as Tulisa and Basnak Dau in Hermann Brockhaus' selections from the Somadeva Bhaṭṭa (Leipzig, 1843) and widely distributed through Ausland magazine (also 1843), The tale was also translated into German by Franz Hoffmann with the title Die Tochter des Holzfällers (Ein Märchen aus Hindostan). and Die Holzbauer Tochter.

It was also published in English in sources such as Household Tales from the East in The Dublin University Magazine in 1869. The tale also circulated in English with titles such as The Wood-Cutter's Daughter and the Mysterious Voice in the compilation The Ruby Fairy Book; The Wood-cutter's Daughter, in The Asiatic Journal; and Tulisa (A Hindoo Wonder Tale).

The tale was also translated to Czech and published in some editions of literary supplement Česká Včela (cs) in 1844 (in segmented format), with the title Drwoštěpowa dcera.

The tale was also translated into French as La Fille du Bûcheron, and the translator noted its "remarkable analogy to the classic fable of Psyche".

Analysis

Tale type 

Later commentators saw common elements with Cupid and Psyche, as written by Apuleius in The Golden Ass. German philologist Ludwig Friedländer and Adolf Zinzow, for instance, treated The Tale of Tulisa as part of the "Cupid and Psyche" cycle of stories: heroine marrying supernatural or animal husband and losing him soon after, then having to search for him.

Folklorists Johannes Bolte and Jiri Polívka, in their Anmerkungen zu den Kinder- u. hausmärchen der brüder Grimm, Second Volume, listed the tale of Tulisa as a variant of German folktale The Singing, Springing Lark, collected by the Brothers Grimm, which is another variant of the Cupid and Psyche and Animal as Bridegroom tales. In the same vein, Folklorist Joseph Jacobs, in his book Europa's Fairy Book, mentioned the tale of Tulisa as having some sort of connection to the Graeco-Roman, namely, their common motifs: the invisible husband; the violation of taboo; the mother-in-law's tasks; the wife's triumph at the end.

Danish folklore researcher Inger Margrethe Boberg also cited the tale of Tulisa in her study on the story of Cupid and Psyche.

Swedish scholar  considered the story of Tulisa close to his type A, which consists of tales wherein the heroine is forced to perform tasks for a witch or for her mother-in-law.

Motifs
In his work about Cupid and Psyche and other Animal as Bridegroom tales, Swedish scholar  identified that, in certain tales, the heroine causes her supernatural husband's disappearance by inquiring his name. Swahn named this motif The Name Taboo and surmised that it occurred "primarily in India".

Variants

Europe

Romani people
Transylvanian linguist Heinrich von Wlislocki collected and published a "Zigeunermärchen" from the Romani titled O thágár sápengré or Der Schlangenkönig (English: "The Snake King"). He noted the great resemblance to the Indian story of Tulisa: a girl named Lolerme goes to the forest to fetch firewood and finds some pieces of gold on the ground. She picks one up and sees that they make a trail to a cavern entry. When she sits to rest, a giant snake with "a head shining like gold" and a red beard appears and introduces itself as the King of Snakes, who has fallen in love with Lolerme. The girl is frightened at first but the snake reveals it wants to give her mother great wealth. They marry and she lives a comfortable life, but her husband comes at night in human form. One day, a pregnant Lolerme helps an ugly old woman in front of the cave; she advises the girl who asks herself who the father of the child is, and about the youth that comes at night. She does so: the youth reveals himself to be the Snake King who the ugly old woman, a witch, cursed into serpent form. The youth curses his wife that she will not give birth, nor she will ever see him again, and vanishes. Desolate, Lolerme cries on the forest ground, until a giant cat approaches her and gives her the egg of the Tscharana bird (de), which, if roosted, will hatch a bird that can kill the witch and bring her husband back. Johannes Bolte and Jiří Polívka also listed Wislocki's tale as another variant of The Singing, Springing Lark. Danish scholar Inger Margrethe Boberg noted that the Lolerme story corresponded to Tulisa, although it lacked the long wandering of type 425A, and the tasks of type 425B.

Azerbaijan
In an Azeri tale titled "Шамси-Камар" ("Shamsi-Kamar" or "Sun-Moon"), by analysing the ripeness of three melons, the king notices it is past time to marry his three daughters, so he organizes a contest: his daughters should cast three arrows at random, see where they land and marry the man that lives wherever the arrows land on. The two elders marry the son of a vizier and the son of a "vekila", while the youngest's arrow lands on a bush. The princess is dressed up and made to wait by the bush. A snake crawls out of the bush, summons a house and bids her enter. He takes off his scales, reveals he is a human named Shamsi-Kamar, and warns that the secret must stay between them, otherwise he will disappear and she must wear down a pair of iron shoes and walk with an iron cane. Her family visits her and she tells her mother the secret of the snake skin. Her mother takes the animal skin and throws it in the fire. Shamsi-Kamar enters the room, admonishes his wife and disappears. The princess follows his instructions and wanders the world for seven years, until her pair of iron shoes is worn out. Nearby, she sees some servant girls fetching water for their master, Shamsi-Kamar. The princess drops her ring on a jug that is taken to her husband, and he notices it. He brings her home on the pretense of having her as a maid. His father, then, orders her to fetch firewood in the forest. Her husband teaches her how to perform it: she must go to the woods and shout out that Shamsi-Kamar has died, and the firewood is for his pyre. That night, his father marries Shamsi-Kamar to another girl, but the prince goes to the kitchen, heats up two cauldrons of water, takes them and pours the scalding hot water on his second wife. He and the princess then escape on horses back to her kingdom. The compiler classified the tale as type 425, and located its source as collected in 1930, in Nakhkray (Nakhchivan Autonomous Republic).

Albania
In an Albanian variant translated by Albanologist Robert Elsie as The Snake and the King's Daughter, a snake slithers into an old woman's basket and, after some time, asks the old woman to go to the king and request for the hand of his daughter in marriage. The king sets as condition three tasks for the future son-in-law, which the snake performs with a magic ring. The princess and the snake marry. On the nuptial night, he reveals he is a handsome prince named "Swift" (Shpejt/Shpeit) underneath the snakeskin and warns that she must not tell anything to her family. One day, the princess is invited to a wedding, and her husband appears lately at the occasion, to everyone's surprise. The princess reveals the man is her husband and he disappears. She goes on a quest for him with a pair of iron shoes, and passes by the houses of the Mother of the Sun, the Mother of the Moon and the Mother of the Winds. The Winds tell her her husband Swift is being held prisoner by a monster named Kulshedra, on an island across the sea, and she begs him to take her there. The wind carries her across the sea to the island and the Kulshedra captures her, taking her to its lair. Secretly, Swift lets his ring fall into a jug she is washing and she recognizes her husband is there. The next day, the Kulshedra forces the girl to sweep some parts of the floor and not sweep the other, and to fill two cauldrons with her tears - both tasks accomplished with her husband's advice. The Kulshedra plans to eat the prince, so he devises a plan: he disguises himself as a poor man and chops wood in the nearby forest. The Kulshedra approaches and inquires the man, who answers that he is fashioning a coffin for Swift. The man convinces the Kulshedra to take a look inside the coffin, shoves the creature inside and burns it to ashes.

Romania
Author Iuliu Traian Mera published in magazine Convorbiri Literare a Romanian variant titled Crăişorul Şărpilor or Crăişorul Şerpilor ("Prince Serpent"). In this tale, an old peasant couple lives in the edge of the village, in the forest. They live by scavenging from the forest. One day, the old man finds a little snake in the forest and brings it home. His wife decides to take care of it with milk. Time passes; the little snake refers to the couple as its parents and, when he is old enough, decides to choose a bride: the daughter of the Imparatul Verde ("Green Emperor"). The snake's mother goes to the Green Emperor to ask for her hand in marriage, but the Green Emperor sets three tasks: first, to build a palace over the poor couple's hut; second, to build a bridge between their palaces, with gardens by its side, with singing little birds and a bell on each bird; third, to have, under the bridge, water sweet as honey and as crystalline, whose waves crash at the Green Emperor's palace, and where every fish swims. Crăişorul Şărpilor, as a snake, fulfills the tasks and gets to marry the Green Emperor's daughter. After they enter the wedding chambers, the snake takes off its skin to become a handsome man, with golden hair, face fair as milkfoam, and dark eyes. Crăişorul Şărpilor remains human by night and wears the snakeskin by day. This goes on for some time, until the Green Emperor wants to invite nobles from all around the world for a banquet. Crăişorul Şărpilor worries about being a snake during the celebration, but he takes off the snakeskin and goes with his wife. Meanwhile, the Green Emperor's wife, the Empress, finds the snakeskin and throws it in an oven - the story explains that the snake prince's curse was about to end, had the snakeskin not been destroyed. During the banquet, Crăişorul Şărpilor senses the snakeskin was burned, and talks to his wife that he needs to disappear, and he will only be found in the Isle of Snakes ("ostrovul şărpilor"), though the path is dangerous and even more dangerous is the Isle, filled with snakes and dragons. He disappears, leaving the princess alone; his palace, the bridge and the sea also vanishing with him. The Green Emperor's daughter begins her long quest. On the road, she helps a little bird, a hare and a deer, which promise to help her in the future. She then reaches the lair of the Mama Padurii ("Mother of the Forest"), deep in a dark forest. Mama Padurii promises to guide the princess, in exchange for a year of servitude under her. The princess's task is to watch over her hens, but one of them disappears after the princess dozes off. She summons the little bird, the hare and the deer to help her locate the lost hen. The hen disappears again on the next two days, but her animal helpers aid her. Now free of Mama Padurii, the creature tells the princess to cross a dangerous valley. The deer helper advises the princess to seek the help of Sfânta Duminecă (Holy Sunday), who lives in a hut. Sfânta Duminecă asks the princess to work for her for another year, just herding the sheep. With an easier task, the princess performs her chores. For her kindness, Sfânta Duminecă tells that a river  marks the threshold between their world and the Isle of Snakes, and that her husband, Crăişorul Şărpilor, takes a bath every morning by sunrise in the river. Armed with this knowledge, the princess keeps walking for another nine years, through nine lands and nine seas, until, one day, by sunrise, she sees her husband taking a bath in the river and goes to him. She embraces him, but he warns her that his family (four sisters and his mother) are terrible, snake-like creatures that will kill her. She decides to remain with him, despite the danger. The snake-like family returns and hisses at their guest, who Crăişorul Şărpilor introduces as his human wife. Crăişorul Şărpilor's mother begins to devise a way to kill her. On the first day, she orders the princess to bake six pies for them, three unbaked and three baked; on the second day, to fill a bottle with her tears. Crăişorul Şărpilor helps her on both tasks. As a third task, the princess is to get a sieve from a draconic neighbour. Crăişorul Şărpilor gives her a ring and tells the princess to use it as the draconic neighbour goes to the kitchen to sharpen her teeth. In the neighbour's house, the princess places the ring to answer for her, get the sieve and escapes. Finally, Crăişorul Şărpilor and his wife decide to escape from his snake family in a "Magic Flight" sequence: they shapeshift into a melon orchard (the princess) and an orchard keeper (him), then into a mill (the princess) and a miller (him), next into a pair of birds pecking corn on the road (both), and lastly into an elm tree (the princess) and ivy (him). Crăişorul Şărpilor's mother comes to the tree, recognizes it as both her son and his wife, but, not knowing which is which, lets them be. Crăişorul Şărpilor and his wife go back to the Green Emperor's palace and live out their days in peace and happiness.

Asia

India
In a variant collected by Alice Elizabeth Dracott, in Simla, with the title The Snake's Bride, Rajah Bunsi Lall becomes a snake and moves to a new home underground. One day, he sees a maiden named Sukkia in the forest gathering sticks and asks her if she wants to marry him. She returns to her stepmother and tells her the incident. The stepmother says she must agree if the snake can fill her house with silver. Sukkia becomes the Snake's Bride, and notices that her husband can transform into human form at night, but never reveals his true name. Sukkia's stepmother, who knows the whole story, convinces her stepdaughter to ask the snake his true name. She does and he disappears, going back to his underground home. Sukkia wanders through the world and arrives at Rajah Bunsi Lall's kingdom while fetching water. She gives her engagement ring to the Rajah's servants, who take it to their master. The Rajah's mother discovers her daughter-in-law is trying to contact her son and, enraged, tries to kill Sukkia, first by filling a room with scorpions and snakes and inviting her to sleep there. However, Bunsi Lall discovers his mother's ploy and removes the animals from the room to protect his wife. Next, Bunsi Lall's mother forces her to count mustard seeds - punishable by death if failing. Bunsi Lall summons little birds to help her. Lastly she makes Sukkia carry torches during the Rajah's wedding procession, where she begins to shout she is burning. Sukkia's husband, the Rajah, hears her screams and takes her back to their home in the upper world.

Sri Lanka 
Author Henry Parker collected a Sinhalese language tale from Sri Lanka with the title Rāksayāgeyi Kumārikāwageyi Katantaraya, translated as The Story of the Rākshasa and the Princess. In this tale, a king and a queen have a daughter, the princess. While divining her future, they learn that her future spouse is a Rakshasa. Some time later, the king and the queen die, leaving the princess on her own. Meanwhile, the Rakshasa uses his powers to summon the princess's palace to his location. It happens thus. The princess leaves the palace and meets the Rakshasa, who takes her in to his mother, a Rakshasi. One day, the Rakshasi tells the princess she is going out to eat some human bodies, and orders the girl to bring seven large pots of water, seven large bundles of firewood, boil and pound seven paelas of paddy-rice, plaster cow dung in seven houses, and have the Rakshasi's bathwater ready. After she leaves, the princess begins to cry, when the Rakshasa appears to her and offers to do the chores in her place. Next, the Rakshasi orders the princess to pay a visit to the Rakshasi's younger sister and take from there a box. The Rakshasa advises the princess to get the box near the door and escape while his aunt is distracted blowing the fire in the hearth. The princess follows his orders and takes the box; the Rakshasi's younger sister chases after her, but fails to catch her. Thirdly, the Rakshasi prepares her son's wedding, and orders the princess to set the tables and chair and prepare the food. After the Rakshasa's marriage, the Rakshasi asks her daughter-in-law to eat the human princess, but somehow she cannot do so. Back to the Rakshasa and the princess, they enter her palace and teleport away.

See also
 The Enchanted Snake, Italian literary fairy tale
 The Snake Prince, a Punjabi tale included in Andrew Lang's The Olive Fairy Book
 Princess Himal and Nagaray, Kashmiri folktale
 Champavati, Assamese folktale
 The Ruby Prince (Punjabi folktale)
 Eglė the Queen of Serpents, Lithuanian fairy tale about a maiden and a snake husband

Footnotes

References

Bibliography

 Bonilla y San Matin, Adolfo. El mito de Psyquis: un cuento de niños, una tradición simbólica y un estudio sobre el problema fundamental de la filosofía. Barcelona: Imprenta de Henrich y Cia. 1908. p. 341.
 Cosquin, Emmanuel. Contes populaires de Lorraine comparés aves les contes de autres provinces de France et des pays étrangers, et précédes d'un essai sur l'origine et la propagation des contes populaires européens. Tome II. Paris: Vieweg. 1887. pp. 225–227.
 Dunlop, John Colin. History of Prose Fiction. A new edition, with revised notes, appendices and index. Vol. I. London: George Bell and Sons. 1896. pp. 110–112 (footnote).
 Friedländer, Ludwig. Roman life and manners under the early Empire. Vol. IV. London: Routledge. 1913. pp. 112–115 and 122–123.
 Hahn, Johann Georg von. Griechische und Albanesische Märchen 1–2. München/Berlin: Georg Müller. 1918 [1864]. pp. 481–483.
 
 Jacobi, Hermann; Meyer, Johann Jakob. Hindu Tales. London: Luzac & Co. 1909. p. 288. (footnote nr. 4).
 Jacobs, Joseph. European Folk and Fairy Tales. New York, London: G. P. Putnam's sons. 1916. pp. 246–249.
 Morton, Marsha. Max Klinger and Wilhelmine Culture: On the Threshold of German Modernism. London and New York: Routledge. 2016. p. 238. 
 Purser, Louis Claude. The Story of Cupid and Psyche as related by Apuleius. London: George Bell and Sons. 1910. pp. xlvii-li.
 Zinzow, Adolf. Psyche und Eros: ein milesisches märchen in der darstellung und auffassung des Apulejus beleuchtet und auf seinen mythologischen zusammenhang, gehalt und ursprung zurückgeführt. Buchhandlung des Waisenhauses. 1888. pp. 302–306.
 "Tulisa, la figlia del taglialegna". In: Storie di Amore e Psiche. A cura di Annamaria Zesi. Roma: L'Asino d'Oro Edizioni. 2010. pp. 42–57. .

Further reading
 

Indian folklore
Indian fairy tales
Fictional princes
Male characters in fairy tales
Female characters in fairy tales
Indian literature
ATU 400-459